Benedict Bermange (born 19 March 1975) is a British cricket statistician.

Bermange was educated at Haberdashers' Aske's School  He studied at Durham University, where he captained the Hatfield College cricket team and played alongside Andrew Strauss. While still a student, he set up the first online cricket ratings site in 1994.

Bermange contributes a regular column to the Sky Sports website featuring statistical highlights of the previous week's cricket.

References

Living people
Alumni of Hatfield College, Durham
Cricket scorers
English Jews
1975 births
Cricket statisticians